Turkey's migrant crisis, sometimes referred to as Turkey's refugee crisis, was a period during the 2010s characterized by high numbers of people migrating to Turkey to take up residence in the country. Turkey received the highest number of registered refugees of any country or territory every year from 2014 to 2019, and had the world's largest refugee population according to the United Nations High Commissioner for Refugees (UNHCR). The majority were refugees of the Syrian Civil War, numbering 3,591,892 as of June 2020. In 2018 the UNHCR reported that Turkey hosted 63.4% of all the "registered Syrian refugees."

Turkey's migrant crisis is a part of the wider European migrant crisis. On 20 March 2016, a deal between the EU and Turkey to tackle the migrant crisis formally came into effect.  The agreement was intended to limit the influx of irregular migrants entering the EU through Turkey. In December 2020, the contract finished and EU extended it until the 2022, giving an extra €485 million to Turkey. The migrant crisis has had a significant impact on Turkey's relationship with the EU.

In response to the crisis, Turkey passed the Law on Foreigners and International Protection and the Temporary Protection, established Syria–Turkey and Iran–Turkey barrier to stop smuggling and improve security, and negotiated ceasefires in Syria in order to established Safe Zones for civilians.

Major refugee flows 

Immigration to Turkey has historical roots in the dissolution of the Ottoman Empire, beginning in the late 18th century until the end of the 20th century. During this time, an estimated 10 million Ottoman Muslim citizens, the refugees or corresponding old term "Muhacir", and their descendants born after the onset of the dissolution of the Ottoman Empire emigrated to Thrace and Anatolia. Turkey became a country of immigration again beginning in the 1980s  when crises throughout the Middle East gave rise to wave after wave of refugees seeking safe haven.

The most important factors driving immigration to Turkey are (1) armed conflict, (2) ethnic intolerance, (3) religious fundamentalism, and (4) political tensions. The influx of refugees, irregular and transit migrations came to Turkey particularly from the Middle East (Iraq) starting from the 1980s.

Influx from the Iran-Iraq War
The largest group of refugees has been Iranians (until the Syrian civil war). The first influx was the Iranians fleeing from the Iranian Revolution, which began in 1980. The Iran–Iraq War began on 22 September of the same year. Revolution and War brought a combined influx from Iran. 1980 to 1991, a total of 1.5 million Iranians became refugees in Turkey. These refugees weren't recognized as asylum seekers under the terms of the Geneva Convention, because they entered and stayed as tourists; making them Iranian diaspora. The Baháʼí Faith had about 350,000 believers in Iran. According to the UN Special Representative, since 1979, many members of this community have left Iran illegally, due to state-sanctioned persecution of Bahá'ís, often to go to Turkey and if possible to West from Turkey.

During the same period; 51,542 Iraqis (Iraqis in Turkey) became refugees in Turkey. The Iran–Iraq War and Kurdish rebellion of 1983 caused the first large-scale influx of refugees from the region.

Amnesty International and UNHCR pressured Turkey (not respecting human rights) for Iranian refugees.

Influx from the Gulf War
 About 450,000 Kurds were on the mountainsides where Turkey-Iraq border. UN SC Resolution 688 was passed, which paved the way for the Operation Northern Watch (ONW), the successor to Operation Provide Comfort, was a Combined Task Force (CTF) charged with enforcing its own no-fly zone above the 36th parallel in Iraq, following refugee flow to Turkey.

The final tally for Gulf War was at least 1 Million people fled (almost 30% of the population) to Iran, Turkey, and Pakistan.

Influx from the War in Afghanistan 
Refugee numbers greatly increased in the following years of War in Afghanistan especially in regards to Afghans and Iraqis. As of January 2010, 25,580 refugees and asylum seekers remain in the country. Of these, 5090 Iranians, 8940 Iraqis, 3850 Afghans and 2700 "other" (including Somalis, Uzbeks, Palestinians, and others). As of January 2011, 8710 Iranians, 9560 Afghans, 7860 other. As of January 2012 7890 (Iranians, Afghans, and other).

Influx from the Syrian Civil War 

Refugees of the Syrian Civil War in Turkey are the Syrian refugees originated from Syrian Civil War, Turkey is hosting over 3.6 million (2019 number) "registered" refugees and delivered aid reaching $30 billion (total between 2011 and 2018) on refugee assistance.

Influx from the Russo-Ukrainian War 
On 24 February 2022, Russia invaded Ukraine. By 3 March, Turkey announced that 20,000 Ukrainian refugees had entered Turkey since the start of the invasion. Interior Minister Süleyman Soylu said that Turkey was glad to welcome them. By March 8, official figures put the number of Ukrainian refugees in the country at 20,550, of whom 551 were of Crimean Tatar or Meskhetian Turk origin. The Ukrainian winner of the 2016 Eurovision Song Contest, Jamala, who is of Crimean Tatar origin, also sought refuge in Turkey. By 23 March, the number of Ukrainian refugees had risen above 58,000. The invasion has also led at least 14,000 Russians to relocate to Turkey.

Conditions 

Turkey didn't establish "classic" refugee camps and didn't name them refugee camps until 2018. They were managed by the Disaster and Emergency Management Presidency (FEMA type organization) along its borders. Turkey established "Temporary Accommodation Centers," such as Kilis Oncupinar Accommodation Facility. Syrians residing outside of TACs live alongside Turkish communities that create short-to-medium term opportunities to harmonize and form economic contributions. Turkey give them permission to settle in Adana, Afyonkarahisar, Ağrı, Aksaray, Amasya, Bilecik, Burdur, Çankırı, Çorum, Eskişehir, Gaziantep, Hakkâri, Hatay, Isparta, Kahramanmaraş, Karaman, Kastamonu, Kayseri, Kırıkkale, Kırşehir, Konya, Kütahya, Mersin, Nevşehir, Niğde, Sivas, Şırnak, Tokat, Van and Yozgat as well as Istanbul. Refugees from Somalia settled in Konya, Iranis in Kayseri and Konya, Isparta, and Van, refugees from Iraq in Istanbul, Çorum, Amasya, Sivas and refugees from Afghanistan in Van, and Ağrı.

Migrant Presence Monitoring 
Directorate General of Migration Management (DGMM) focuses on the mobility trends, migrant profiles, and urgent needs of migrants. The data generated allows the organizations and the government to plan their short and long-term migration-related program and policies.

Effect on the host country 
Compared to the international refugee regime (Refugee law), Turkey has a different approach which they named as "morality oriented approach" instead of security centered (Refugee#Security threats) approach towards Syrians refugees. Turkey incurs high expenses related to refugee care (housing, employment, education, and health), including medical expenses, with minimal support from other countries.

Refugees impact on economic and social issues: 
increases in food and house prices and property rents. 
low-paid refugees increased the unemployment rate (southern Turkey).

Security impact 
The migrant crisis developed at the most complex geostrategic position in the world, the situation contained ongoing active, proxy, or cooling wars as Turkey shared borders with Iraq (2003 US-led invasion, Iraq War (2003–2011), and Iraqi insurgency (2003–2011)), Iran (Iran–Israel proxy conflict), Syria (Syrian civil war), Georgia (Russo-Georgian War), Azerbaijan (Nagorno-Karabakh conflict), Greece and Bulgaria. In line with the escalating fragility in the region, Turkey directly joined the fight against Islamic State of Iraq and the Levant (Turkey–ISIL conflict) in August 2016. The dynamics of the Syrian civil war spilled over into Turkish territory (ISIL rocket attacks on Turkey (2016)). ISIS carried out a series (2013 Reyhanlı bombings, 2015 Suruç bombing, March 2016 Istanbul bombing) of attacks against Turkish civilians by using suicide bombers. The deadliest terrorism in Turkish history, as of 2019, The ISIS attack (2015 Ankara bombings) against a peace rally.

Syria–Turkey and Iran–Turkey barrier

The Syria–Turkey barrier is a border wall and fence under construction along the Syria–Turkey border aimed at preventing illegal crossings and smuggling.

The Iran–Turkey barrier, finished spring 2019, at the Turkey-Iran border aimed to prevent illegal crossings and smuggling across the border. It will cover  of the very high mountainous  border with natural barriers.

Migrant smuggling 
In the Black Sea region, countries are both sources and destinations for refugees. For the destination of Turkey; originating Moldova, Ukraine, Russian Federation, Kyrgyzstan, and Uzbekistan are targets for human trafficking (migration using ships, ship operators are smugglers). The top five countries of destination in the region between 2000 and 2007 were Russia (1,860), Turkey (1,157), Moldova (696), Albania (348), and Serbia (233).

A crackdown by Turkish police has resulted in the termination of a network that mainly helped Afghan, Iraqi and Syrian nationals cross into European countries.

Refugees and spillover 
See: Spillover of the Syrian Civil War#Turkey, Refugees as weapons#Syrian Civil War

In Turkey, public opinion towards intervention is correlated with their daily exposure to refugees. In Turkish people, emphasizing the negative forces created by hosting refugees, including their connection with militants, increases support for intervention. Turkish people living at the border don't support intervention. Turkey doesn't put refugees camps at the border;  they are distributed across Turkey.

Response to the refugee crisis 
External aid organizations; UN agencies have a Regional Refugee and Resilience Plan co-led by UNHCR and UNDP under Turkey. Private INGOs work in partnership with Turkish NonGovernmental Organisations (NGOs) and associations to support the delivery of services through national systems, help link refugees and asylum seekers with governmental services.

Law on Foreigners and International Protection and the Temporary Protection 
The Government of Turkey recognized that the traditional immigration laws need to be organized and updated under these new circumstances. The first domestic law on asylum, before covered under secondary legislation such as administrative circulars.

The rules and regulations in providing protection and assistance to Syrians is established by "The Law on Foreigners and International Protection and the Temporary Protection Regulation." Law provides the legal basis of their "refugee status" and establishing temporary protection for Syrians and international protection for applicants and refugees of other nationalities. The basis of any/all assistance to refugees, including access to health and education services, as well as access to legal employment is defined under this law. The Law states that foreigners and others with international protection will not be sent back to places where they will be tortured, suffer inhumane treatment or punishment that is humiliating, or be threatened due to race, religion, or group membership. Law created an agency under the Turkish Ministry of Justice on international protection, which also implements related regulations. Investigative authority is established to question marriages between Turkish citizens and foreigners for the “reasonable suspicions” of fraud. The uninterrupted residence permits for eight years will be able to receive unlimited residence permits.

As of 16 March 2018, there is a modification to law; following the passage of the law 21 official "Temporary Protection Centres" (TPCs) in provinces along the Syrian border established, the Directorate-General of Migration Management of Turkey (DGMM), under the Ministry of Interior, has assumed responsibility for TPCs from Disaster and Emergency Management Presidency.

Migration diplomacy 

International migration is an important domain at foreign policy development.

Accession to the EU 
Migration is part of accession of Turkey to the European Union. On March 16, 2016, Cyprus had become a hurdle to the EU-Turkey deal on the migrant crisis. The EU linked advancing membership bid to a settlement of the decades-old Cyprus dispute, further complicating efforts to win Ankara's help in resolving Europe's migration crisis.

2015 EU-Turkey Joint Action Plan 

In 2012, the governments of Turkey and Greece have agreed to work together, to implement border control. In response to Syrian crisis; Greece built a razor-wire fence in 2012 along its short land border with Turkey.

A period beginning in 2015, The European migrant crisis is characterized by rising numbers of people arriving in the European Union (EU) from across the Mediterranean Sea or overland through Southeast Europe. In September 2015, Turkish provincial authorities gave approximately 1,700 migrants three days to leave the border zone. As a result of Greece's diversion of migrants to Bulgaria from Turkey, Bulgaria built its own fence to block migrants crossing from Turkey.

The EU-Turkey Joint Action Plan prioritizes border security and develops mechanisms to keep refugees inside Turkey [prevent migration to EU states]. The amount allocated [EU: €3 billion] for financial support for 2016–2018 will ease the financial burden [Turkey: $30 billion between 2011 and 2018] but not better living conditions.

European states deny refugees from Turkey. On 18 May 2016, lawmakers from the European Parliament's Subcommittee on Human Rights (DROI) have said that Turkey should not use Syrian refugees as a bribe for the process of visa liberalization for Turkish citizens inside the European Union.

The UNHCR (not a party) criticized and declined to be involved in returns. Médecins Sans Frontières, the International Rescue Committee, the Norwegian Refugee Council and Save the Children declined to be involved. These organization object the blanket expulsion of refugees contravened international law.

"Safe Country" for EU 
In 2019 Greece resumed deportations in response to an increase in refugees over the summer months.

"Safe zone" for refugees 
The Syrian peace process and de-escalation are ongoing efforts beginning as early as 2011. Return of refugees of the Syrian civil war is the returning to the place of origin (Syria) of a Syrian refugee. Turkey promoted the idea of de-escalation regions from 2015, world powers declined to help create a zone (example: Iraq safe zone established by Operation Provide Comfort) to protect civilians. Regarding safety of the refugees, progress needs to be made before any significant returns can be planned for. Turkey, Russia and Iran agreed in 2017 to create the Idlib demilitarization (2018–present). (March 2017 and May 2017 Astana talks: De-escalation zones) As of 2019, Idleb and Eastern Ghouta, de-escalation zones remain insecure. President Erdogan says Syria's Idlib, de-escalation zone in Syria's Idlib region, slowly disappearing. Idlib's safe zone is more like conflict zone in a way Aleppo conflict zone (referring to Battle of Aleppo (2012–2016). In 2019, Northern Syria Buffer Zone is a thin strip of the border in northern Syria which will be a “safe zone” and can only be achieved by finding a solution to the conflicting goals of Russia and the United States. A safe zone will stem the wave of migrations, but Turkey will also clear its border of Islamic State and Kurdish militia fighters.

See also 
 European migrant crisis
 Immigration to Turkey

Further reading

References
Notes

Citations

Migrant crises
Turkey
2010s in Turkey
2010s in Iraq
2010s in Libya
2010s in Syria
2010s in the European Union
Aftermath of the First Libyan Civil War
Aftermath of the War in Iraq (2013–2017)
Syrian civil war